AT&T Broadband was AT&T's cable operations division. It was formed in 1999 when AT&T acquired the assets of TCI and renamed it to AT&T Broadband. The next year, AT&T Broadband acquired MediaOne as well and became the largest cable operations company in the United States. In 2001, AT&T swapped the cable systems to Cable One in the San Joaquin Valley region of California, eastern Oregon, northern Utah, and southern Idaho. Later that same year, it was announced that AT&T Broadband and the Comcast Corporation will be merging their assets into "AT&T Comcast Corporation". The deal was finalized in mid-November 2002 and AT&T Broadband fully merged into Comcast Corporation.

Merge with Comcast 

On December 19, 2001, AT&T Broadband and Comcast Corporation announced that they will be merging as a decision was made by their respective Board of Directors. The value of the transaction was $72 billion and jointly had covered over 22 million subscribers across all United States. Originally, the name of the merger company was supposed to be AT&T Comcast Corporation with each company providing 5 members for the Board of Directors, including 2 external members.

In 2002, AT&T went through corporate restructuring. In the middle of November 2002, the deal was finalized and Comcast acquired AT&T Broadband under the name "Comcast Corporation".

See also
Excite webportal

References

Comcast
Former AT&T subsidiaries
Companies based in Englewood, Colorado
Telecommunications companies established in 1999
Defunct companies based in Colorado
Defunct telecommunications companies of the United States
1999 establishments in Colorado